Cristina Possas de Albuquerque (born 5 June 1948) is a Brazilian public health scientist working with infectious diseases and emerging infectious diseases from an eco-social perspective.

She is a Takemi Fellow at Harvard University in Boston, where for 10 years she has been a visiting scientist and a Fulbright Fellow. She has been since 1976 a professor at FIOCRUZ in Rio de Janeiro, Brazil.

Education and employment
After her undergraduate studies, Possas completed a PhD in psychology at the Pontifical Catholic University of Rio de Janeiro (PUC-RIO) in 1972. After completing her MSocSc at the State University of Campinas (UNICAMP) in 1980 Possas was appointed to the Oswaldo Cruz Foundation (Portuguese Fundação Oswaldo Cruz, also known as FIOCRUZ) in Rio de Janeiro, Brazil as a full professor in 1985 where she has worked ever since, completing a public health PhD at the National School of Public Health in 1988.

Whilst working at FIOCRUZ she has also spent time as a Fulbright Fellow and Takemi Fellow in International Health at Harvard University from 1990 to 1994 before becoming a visiting scientist with the New Diseases Group at Harvard School of Public Health from 1994 to 2002. Possas also served as National Executive Secretary, National Technical Biosafety Commission (CTNBio), Ministry of Science and Technology, Brazil from 2001 to 2002 and Head, Research and Technological Development Unit, National AIDS Program, Ministry of Health, Brazil, 2002–2011.

She has given radio and television interviews on AIDS, Dengue fever, and Zika fever.

Awards and distinctions 
 1983. FINEP research grant on Health System Evaluation, coordinating 7 subprojects, Medical School, PUC-Campinas, SP
 1989. FINEP (Financiadora de Estudos e Projetos) grant, Coordinator National Multicentric Project Evaluation Health Systems, FIOCRUZ, RJ
 1991. Capes Fellowship, Harvard University
 1992. Takemi Fellow, Harvard University.
 1993. CNPq Scientific Productivity Fellowship

Selected publications
 
 
 
 
 Possas, C. 1989. Epidemiologia e Sociedade: Heterogeneidade Estrutural e Saúde no Brasil [Epidemiology and Society: Structural Heterogeneity and Health in Brazil. Hucitec, São Paulo.
 Possas, C. 1980. Saúde e Trabalho: a Crise da Previdência Social [Health and Labour: the crisis of Social Welfare in Brazil], [2nd edition in 1989]. Hucitec. [Winner award of honors from the Brazilian Society of Social Welfare Rights in 1981 for the best book on Social Welfare].

References

External links
 Entrevista, Dr. Cristina Possas discusses AIDS, Dec 16, 2015

HIV/AIDS researchers
Brazilian women scientists
20th-century women scientists
Living people
Women naturalists
Harvard School of Public Health people
South America articles needing expert attention
Brazilian educators
Brazilian feminists
Brazilian epidemiologists
1948 births
People from Rio de Janeiro (city)
Fulbright alumni
Women epidemiologists